Lagma is a village in the northern Indian state of Bihar representing the Rajput, Brahman, Musahar communities.

Geography
Lagma is located on the bank of the Kosi River. It is surrounded by the river on three sides. Highway NH-107 passes through the village. It is about 25 kilometers from Saharsa district and 7 Kilometers from Sonbarsa Block. There are three schools in this village, one primary school, one middle school and One high school near NH-107.

Villages in Saharsa district